The community of universities and higher education institutions of Aquitaine  (CUEA) is an association of universities and higher education institutions (ComUE) for higher education institutions in the Aquitaine region of France, including the city of Bordeaux.

History
Groupings of higher education institutions in the Bordeaux area date back at least to 1997 with the creation of a "pôle universitaire de Bordeaux". In 2007 under the auspices of a 2006 law creating Pôle de recherche et d'enseignement supérieur the PRES Université de Bordeaux was organized, grouping the 4 Bordeaux universities and several technical schools under one coordinating association.

With the 2013 Law on Higher Education and Research (France) discontinuing PRES and establishing a new associative form in the association of universities and higher education institutions (ComUE), the 2007 Université de Bordeaux was replaced by CUEA (which formally began 11 March 2015). Meanwhile, on 1 January 2014, a new University of Bordeaux had been organized by merging again three of the Bordeaux universities.

Members
The founding members of the CUEA are:
 University of Bordeaux,
 Bordeaux Montaigne University
 University of Pau and Pays de l'Adour
 Bordeaux INP
 Institut d'études politiques de Bordeaux
 Bordeaux Sciences Agro

Associate members are:
 Centre hospitalier universitaire de Bordeaux,
 Institut Bergonié (Centre régional de lutte contre le cancer),
 CROUS de Bordeaux Aquitaine,
 Centre national de la recherche scientifique,
 École nationale supérieure d'architecture et de paysage de Bordeaux,
 KEDGE Business School,
 École supérieure des technologies industrielles avancées (ESTIA),
 École nationale de la magistrature,
 École nationale supérieure d'arts et métiers - centre de Bordeaux (ENSAM),
 École des beaux-arts de Bordeaux.

References

External links 
 CUEA website

Education in Nouvelle-Aquitaine